Galerías Valle Oriente is a shopping mall in Monterrey, Mexico, located in the limits with San Pedro Garza García, on Lazaro Cardenas Avenue, close to the Valle Oriente upscale development district. The mall takes its name from the district. It opened in April, 2003.  The developer was Grupo U-Calli.

Attractions
 Numerous full service restaurants, banks, clothing stores, and a catholic chapel.
 A Liverpool department store.
 IMAX screen and multiplex Cinépolis.
 A large food court.
 Adjacent to Walmart and Costco.
 KidZania Monterrey

External links

Shopping malls in Monterrey
Shopping malls established in 2003